M-22 is a state trunkline highway in the US state of Michigan. It also passes through the Sleeping Bear Dunes National Lakeshore. The highway is U-shaped as it rounds the peninsula running through tourist areas in Leland and Suttons Bay in addition to the national lakeshore.

M-22 is an original trunkline designation dating back to the 1919 designation of the system. Reroutings have moved the highway closer to the water between Suttons Bay and Traverse City. A section of the highway was used temporarily for another highway, M-109. Two sections of the highway have been designated as separate Pure Michigan Byways. The highway marker is used in marketing by a local business as a symbol of the region, a trademark for which has been the subject of legal controversies. A popular roadway in the area with tourists, the highway's marker has also been the subject of sign theft.

Route description

In between the trunkline loops north along Lake Michigan to Northport before turning south along the West Arm of Grand Traverse Bay. The road itself comprises numerous turns and hills, making it a very popular drive for tourists visiting the area from areas such as Chicago and Detroit, especially during autumn. The road runs north to the village of Onekama running east and north of Portage Lake before returning north to Arcadia. M-22 turns northeasterly to curve around the north shore of Crystal Lake after passing through Elberta and Frankfort. South of the Platte River, the highway crosses into the Sleeping Bear Dunes National Lakeshore. East of Platte Lake, M-22 turns northward again toward Empire, headquarters of the national park. M-22 takes the inland route between Little and Big Glen lakes, losing the Lake Michigan Circle Tour designation to M-109 until the two meet again in Glen Arbor. The roadway follows the shoreline of Pyramid Point and passes east out of the national park before turning north to Leland.

Continuing northward, M-22 reaches its northernmost extent in Northport before turning south. It passes through the reservation of the Grand Traverse Band of Chippewa and Ottawa Indians in Peshawbestown, home to one of the tribe's two casinos. Further south is the community of Suttons Bay located on the small bay of the same name. From here south, the highway runs just off the shore of the Grand Traverse Bay south to Greilickville. Just south of Greilickville, M-22 enters a section of the city of Traverse City that is located in Leelanau County, Michigan formed by an acquisition of a neighborhood of Greilickville. Here is the eastern junction between M-22 and M-72. The two highways run concurrently along Grandview Parkway to Division Street. There they meet US 31/M-37 and M-22 ends. A portion of this road has been designated a what is now called a Pure Michigan Scenic Byway by the state of Michigan.

Cultural references

Broneah Kiteboarding, a company based in Traverse City, has adopted the M-22 marker as a logo and sells merchandise such as clothing and bumper stickers featuring it. As such, the logo has become a popular symbol for the company as well as a cultural symbol for the western Grand Traverse Bay area.  The private corporation has attempted to trademark the road sign, which has been legally opposed by the Michigan Attorney General Bill Schuette; that formal opposition was removed by his successor Dana Nessel in 2019.

In 2015, the readers of USA Today voted M-22 the "best scenic autumn drive" in the nation, noting that it offers " of stellar autumn leaf-peeping".

Due to the popularity of the roadway, sign theft along parts of M-22 has become an issue for MDOT. The department announced in 2016 that it was removing the "M" from the top of some of the M-22 markers to combat the issue. The state had replaced about 90 signs in the previous three years, and a department spokesman said the popularity of the highway from merchandise sales and scenic travelers factored into those thefts. The new signs cost between $325 and $350 apiece to manufacture, no different from what the standard M-22 signs cost, and MDOT hoped that the modified signs will prove less popular with thieves. The new signs will be installed as replacements in the areas with the most thefts, like Leelanau County, while the rest of the highway will still receive the standard M-22 marker. A year later, sign theft was still an issue. The department started testing pavement markings because the other efforts had failed. The markings cost $175, but they last only three years compared to the ten-year lifespan of a sign.

History
M-22 is an original trunkline, dating to the July 1, 1919 designation of the system. In 1929, the highway was rerouted along the west side of Little Glen Lake, using the modern M-109 around the lake. M-22 would be rerouted back around to the present routing the next year, and M-109 was designated on the west side of the lake in its place.

Until 1936, M-22's route was on Cherry Bend and Center roads in Leelanau County to Suttons Bay. At that time, M-22 was relocated along the west arm of Grand Traverse Bay onto Center Road up to Crain Hill Road In 1949, M-22 was relocated the rest of the way to Suttons Bay, and the former M-22 on Cherry Bend and Center roads became County Road 633. and in 1945, the last gravel stretch of M-22 from Leland to Northport was paved.

In Traverse City, M-22 originally started at Front and Union streets going west on Front to Elmwood, turning north onto Elmwood, then west on Bay Street to Greilickville. It was relocated onto the newly built Grand View Parkway in 1952, from Greilickville to Division Street (relocated US 31). In 2002, the route of M-22 from the Benzie–Leelanau county line northward to Northport and then south to Traverse City was designated as part of a Michigan Heritage Route along with M-109 and M-204 as the Leelanau Scenic Heritage Route; this moniker was renamed Pure Michigan Byway at the end of 2014. The remainder of the highway was designated as a separate byway in October 2016.

Major intersections

See also

References

External links

M-22 at Michigan Highways
M-22 Autumn Color Tour

022
Lake Michigan Circle Tour
Transportation in Manistee County, Michigan
Transportation in Benzie County, Michigan
Transportation in Leelanau County, Michigan
Transportation in Grand Traverse County, Michigan